Joshua Keck Harder (born August 1, 1986) is an American politician and venture capital investor who has served as the U.S. representative from California's 9th congressional district since 2019 (known as the 10th congressional district until 2023). A member of the Democratic Party, he defeated Republican incumbent Jeff Denham in the 2018 election by five points. In 2020, he was reelected by a significantly larger margin than in 2018. He won reelection to California's new 9th congressional district, created through the 2020 redistricting process, which includes the majority of San Joaquin County.

Early life and education 
Harder was born in Turlock, California, and graduated from Modesto High School. He earned political science and economics undergraduate degrees from Stanford University and a joint MBA/MPP from Harvard Business School and Kennedy School of Government.

Private career 
In 2014, Bessemer Venture Partners hired Harder in its New York office. He moved back to San Francisco and became a vice president of the company. In 2017, Harder left Bessemer to campaign full-time. He moved back to Turlock and taught business at Modesto Junior College.

U.S. House of Representatives

Elections

2018 

In May 2017, Harder announced his candidacy, joining three other Democrats to challenge Republican Jeff Denham, who had represented the 10th district since 2013 and represented the 19th district from 2011 to 2013. As a result of California's top-two primary system, Denham and Harder advanced to the general election, with Denham taking 37.5% of the primary vote and Harder 16.7%.

California's 10th district was included on the list of Republican-held seats being targeted by the Democratic Congressional Campaign Committee in 2018. On election night and for days after the election, Denham led in the reported results. On November 9, Harder pulled ahead as absentee ballots were counted. Days later, news outlets projected Harder's victory, and on November 14, Denham conceded.

2020 

Harder ran for reelection in 2020, finishing first in the top-two open primary with 44% of the vote. He bested Republican opponents Ted Howze and Bob Elliott. Harder and Howze advanced to the general election on November 3, which Harder won with 55.2% of the vote to Howze's 44.8%. In 2020, former President Barack Obama endorsed Harder.

2022 

Following redistricting, Harder defeated San Joaquin County Supervisor Tom Patti, a Republican, with 56% of the vote in California's 9th Congressional district.

Tenure 
Harder has represented California's 10th congressional district since 2019.

After Trump supporters stormed the United States Capitol on January 6, 2021, Harder received hate mail intended for Josh Hawley, a United States senator with a similar name who objected to certifying Joe Biden's electoral college victory.

As of September 2022, Harder had voted in line with President Joe Biden's stated position 100% of the time.

Committee assignments 

 Committee on Agriculture
 Subcommittee on Biotechnology, Horticulture, and Research
 Subcommittee on Livestock and Foreign Agriculture
Committee on Appropriations
Subcommittee on Labor, Health and Human Services, and Education
Subcommittee on Interior, Environment, and Related Agencies

Caucus memberships 
New Democrat Coalition
Problem Solvers Caucus

Political positions

Abortion
As of 2019, Harder had a 100% rating from NARAL Pro-Choice America for his abortion-related voting record. He opposed the overturning of Roe v. Wade.

Electoral history

Personal life 
Harder and his wife Pamela met as undergraduate students at Stanford University. They were married at the Meadowlark Botanical Gardens in Virginia in 2018.

Harder and his wife announced they had a baby daughter on March 9, 2022.

References

External links

 Congressman Josh Harder official U.S. House website
 Josh Harder for Congress campaign website
 

|-

1986 births
Candidates in the 2018 United States elections
Harvard Business School alumni
Living people
Democratic Party members of the United States House of Representatives from California
Modesto Junior College faculty
People from Turlock, California
Stanford University alumni
Harvard Kennedy School alumni